Bankovka is a rural locality (a village) in Yangurchinsky Selsoviet, Sterlibashevsky District, Bashkortostan, Russia. The population was 26 as of 2010. There is 1 street.

Geography 
Bankovka is located 18 km north of Sterlibashevo (the district's administrative centre) by road. Turmayevo is the nearest rural locality.

References 

Rural localities in Sterlibashevsky District